Legislative elections in France (French: élections législatives en France) determine who becomes Members of Parliament, each with the right to sit in the National Assembly, which is the lower house of the French Parliament.

List of elections 

 1789
 1791
 1792
 1795
 1797
 1798
 1799
 1815
 1816
 1817
 1819
 1820
 1824
 1827
 1830
 1831
 1834
 1837
 1839
 1842
 1846
 1848
 1849
 1852
 1857
 1863
 1869
 1871
 1876
 1877
 1881
 1885
 1889
 1893
 1898
 1902
 1906
 1910
 1914
 1919
 1924
 1928
 1932
 1936
 1945
 1946 (Jun)
 1946 (Nov)
 1951
 1956
 1958
 1962
 1967
 1968
 1973
 1978
 1981
 1986
 1988
 1993
 1997
 2002
 2007
 2012
 2017
 2022

References

See also 

 Elections in France

Elections in France
National Assembly (France)
Legislative elections in France